Tema Youth Football Club is a Ghanaian professional football club based in Tema, Greater Accra. The club competed in the 2017 Ghanaian Premier League, but got relegated at the end of the season.

History 
Founded in 2005, TYFC are members of the Glo Premier League. Their home stadium is Tema Sports Stadium. The Harbour Warriors has made some changes to their team both technically and at the management level. Wilfred Osei Palmer, who was once the board chairman and CEO, has now been elevated as the new president of the club. The investment banker who is touted as one of the most outstanding football administrators on the local scene will also work as the sporting director of the club. Sports journalist Henry Asante Twum, formerly of the Ghana Broadcasting Corporation, has also been promoted from the communication directorate of the club to the deputy chief executive officer of the Tema side. The rising broadcaster will now assist businessman Henry Martey has been appointed as the new chief executive officer. Black Satellites assistant coach Prince Owusu has also moved up the ladder after receiving the nod as the technical director. The head coach position of this great club has been given to former Tema Real sportive coach Edward Odoom. He will be assisted by Francis Horku, who also used to be the head coach of the now-defunct Tema All Stars. Former Ghana international Joachim Yaw Acheampong, Isaac Opeele Boateng and Austrian coach Attila Sekerlioglu are some of the notable coaches who have handled the team in the past. The supervisory job of the club is done by Mr. Emmanuel Kyeremeh, a businessman and a Chartered Accountant who works with NDK financial services, a non-banking financial institution in Accra. Emmanuel Kyeremeh is the board chairman of the club. At the end of last season, Tema Youth qualified to play in the Division One middle league but couldn't qualify back to the premier division after securing three points from the three matches the team played. Some of the notable players the team have produced include Ekow Benson, who now plays for premiership side Medaeama after an unsuccessful stint with giants Kumasi Asante Kotoko, Edward Affum is a wonderful striker who also plays for the Accra Hearts of Oak. Richard Annang also plays in the Romanian league for S.C Vaslui. The team can also boast of some talented players who have passed through the ranks. Godfred Fosu, Theophilus Apoh, Abdul Haruna Ganiyu are some other notable players produced by the Tema-based club.

Performance in the 2010–2011 season
With disappointment in the previous season, the management of the Tema-based club decided to offload most of the senior players and start all afresh. The decision paid a huge dividend as the team strolled through the season without losing even a single game in the Division One campaign for the year 2010/2011. In all players like Daniel Appiah, who finished the season with eight goals, was the team's top scorer for the year. Goalkeeper Kofi Mensah was also outstanding and had to catch the eyes of experience coach Oti Akenteng, who later recommended him to the handlers of the national team. Kofi is currently with the national Under 17 team. Derek Mensah, Huzeifah Issah all had a brilliant term. Tema Youth toppled the Zone and therefore qualified to play in the Division One middle league with their eyes on a quick return to the elite division of Ghana Football.  
The team capped the whole campaign by finishing it off in a grand style in the Division One middle league. With opposition from teams like Tete Atenpong, King Solomon FC and DInternational many were those who had a little faith in the capabilities of the young team. Tema Youth beat King Solomon in a thrilling but difficult game 3–2 at the Robert Mensa stadium in Cape Coast, and continued that feat with two separate wins against Tete Atenpong and DInternational. The team beat Tete Atenpong 3–0 and also defeated DInternational 4–1 to seal the qualification. Another season comes to an end, and a what a way to climax it. Tema Youth finished the season unbeaten and gets another ticket to play in the elite division of Ghana Football.

Poly Tank Division One League Zone 3: 2010–11 Standings
 Division  	      P 	W 	D 	L 	GF 	GA 	GD 	PTS 	
 Tema Youth 	 13 	   9 	   4 	   0 	   19 	   6 	   13 	   31 	
 King Solomon 	 13 	   7 	   3 	   3 	   22 	   12 	   10 	   24 	
 Red Bull 	 13   	   5 	   4 	   4 	   17 	   12 	   5 	   19 	
 Okwawu Utd 	 13 	   5 	   3 	   5 	   15 	   11 	   4 	   18 	
 Purejoy 	 13 	   5 	   3 	   5 	   15 	   13 	   2 	   18 	
 Zaytuna 	 13 	   5 	   3 	   5 	   12 	   12 	   0 	   18 	
 Rehoboth 	 13 	   3 	   4 	   6 	   7 	   11 	   -4 	   13 	
 Tema All Stars   13 	   0 	   2 	   11 	   7 	   37 	   -30 	   2

Performance in CAF competitions
CAF Confederation Cup: 1 appearance
2007 - disqualified in First Round

Staff 
Special duties: Samuel Abuabiri
Chief executive officer:Henry Martey
Deputy CEO: Henry Asante Twum
President: Wilfred Osei Kwaku
Welfare officer: Alex Ahadjie
Board CHAIRMAN: Emmanuel Kyeremeh
Director of operations: James Lamina

Sports
Head coach: Edward Odoom
Assistant coach: Francis Horku
Technical director: Prince Owusu

Current squad

Managers
 Anthony Lokko (2005–06)
 John Eshun (2006–07)
 Bright Osei (2008)
 Joachim Yaw (2008)
 David Duncan (2009)
 Isaac "Opeele" Boateng (2009)
 Attila Sekerlioglu (2009)
 Anthony Lokko (2009–11)
 Prince Owusu (coach) (2011–12)
 Edward Odoom (2012–)

Notable Players
 Joseph Paintsil (2016-17)
 Richard Annang (2009-10)

References

External links
 Ghana-pedia webpage - Tema Youth FC

Football clubs in Ghana
Tema
Association football clubs established in 2005
2005 establishments in Ghana
Sports clubs in Ghana